The Twits  is a humorous children's book written by Roald Dahl and illustrated by Quentin Blake. It was written in 1979, and first published by Jonathan Cape in 1980. The story features The Twits (Mr. and Mrs. Twit), a spiteful, idle unkempt couple who continuously play nasty practical jokes on each other to amuse themselves, and exercise their wickedness on their monkeys. The Twits was adapted for the stage in November 2007. 

In 2003, The Twits was listed at number 81 in The Big Read, a BBC survey of the British public of the top 200 novels of all time. In 2012, the titular Twits appeared on a Royal Mail commemorative postage stamp.

Overview
The idea of The Twits was triggered by Dahl's desire to 'do something against beards', because he had an acute hatred of them. The first sentence of the story is, 'What a lot of hairy-faced men there are around nowadays.'

Plot
A hideous, vindictive, spiteful couple known as the Twits live together in a brick house without windows. They continuously play nasty practical jokes on each other out of hatred for each other.

They also keep a family of pet monkeys, the Muggle-Wumps. The Twits, who are retired circus trainers, are trying to create the first upside-down monkey circus. They will always demand the monkeys stand on their heads for hours on end.

Mr. Twit uses glue called Hugtight in hopes of catching birds for Mrs. Twit to make into a bird pie. The monkeys try to warn the birds before they land on the tree, but the English-speaking birds do not understand the monkeys' African language.

Once a week the Roly-Poly bird flies to visit the monkeys, to secretly save the birds by acting as an interpreter of languages. On a Tuesday night, a group of four boys see the ladder next to this tree and they decided to walk up into it, not thinking or knowing that glue was on it. On the Wednesday morning Mr Twit sees that the boys have scared them away. Out of rage Mr Twit charges at them, but they get away. Mr Twit tries several times to catch the birds and, tired of not getting anywhere, Mr. Twit decides to go buy guns with his wife to kill them.

The Muggle-Wumps come up with an idea to use Mr. Twit's glue to attach the Twits' furniture to their ceiling, while the birds come up with an idea to smear glue on the Twits' heads. Shocked, the Twits rush into their home and see the resulting mess. Mr. Twit suggests that they stand on their heads so that they are 'the right way up'. The Roly-Poly bird then offers to fly the Muggle-Wumps all the way back to Africa, and the Muggle-Wumps escape.

Hours later both Mr and Mrs. Twit are putting all their weight down on the heads and catch the 'Dreaded Shrinks'- with their bodies compressing 'downwards.' Their head shrinks into their neck, their necks shrink into their bodies, their bodies shrink into their legs, and their legs shrink into their feet. Their feet shrink into nothing but two pairs of shoes and old clothes. Mr. and Mrs. Twit are then nowhere to be seen.

Mr. Twit
Mr. Twit is a wicked person, having hair that covers his entire face, with the exception of his forehead, eyes, and nose. His hair (which he falsely believes makes him appear 'wise and grand' but is widely agreed by everyone else makes him look like a twit), is spiky and hard. Because he never washes it, his beard holds scraps of food stuck there while he ate, including tinned sardines, Stilton cheese, and corn flakes. Occasionally, he licks these scraps out and eats them when he is hungry.

As part of a plan to make Mrs. Twit feel that she is shrinking, he slowly extended her chair and cane until she was convinced that she was getting shorter.

Instead of wiping his mouth with a cloth, Mr. Twit simply wipes it on his sleeve. Mr. Twit is a drinker with a fondness for beer; he even drinks alcohol at breakfast. He is known to be very quiet when he is plotting. He and his wife mistreat their monkeys, the Muggle-Wumps. They have kept Muggle-Wump and his family locked up in a cage in the garden.
The dreaded shrinks demolished Mr. Twit into nothing. All that was left of the Twits was two bundles of old clothes, two pairs of shoes and a walking stick.

Mrs. Twit
Mrs. Twit is the hideously ugly, menacing wife of Mr. Twit.  She is said to have quite a nice face once, but her ugly thoughts began to show on her face until she was so ugly, you couldn't bear to look at her.

She takes advantage of her glass eye to play practical jokes in revenge against her husband, and demonstrates multiple acts of cruelty and viciousness throughout the story: the main reason behind her use of a walking cane was as a weapon against innocent children and animals, she participates in the torment of the couple's pet monkeys the Muggle-Wumps, and she once served Mr. Twit a lunch of worms disguised as spaghetti.

Albeit, while she frequently demonstrates acts of stupidity, she has also exhibited intelligence: she managed to manoeuvre her way out of being carried off into the sky by balloons by chewing through several of the strings and landing safely on the ground. Aside from this, she is portrayed as being hideous, cruel, and unhygienic.

The Tricks
A series of pranks advance the plot of the story. Brief descriptions appear below:

The Glass Eye
Mrs. Twit removes her glass eye and drops it in her husband's beer mug while he isn't looking. It isn't until he empties the mug that he sees the eye sitting in there, startling him something awful. Mrs. Twit laughs, gloating that this proves she is always watching him.

The Frog
In revenge for the glass eye trick, Mr. Twit places a frog in Mrs. Twit's bed, and frightens Mrs. Twit by claiming the item in her bed is a 'Giant Skillywiggler', with 'teeth like screwdrivers' with which it would bite off her toes. Mrs. Twit then faints, at which point Mr. Twit splashes a jugful of cold water onto her face. She soon recovers, as the frog hops onto her face to get near the water.

Mr. Twit then claims the 'Giant Skillywiggler' will soon bite off her nose. Mrs. Twit then flees.

The Wormy Spaghetti
Seeking revenge for the Frog Trick, Mrs. Twit places worms from the garden in cooked spaghetti, which Mr. Twit eats, being reassured by Mrs. Twit that it is merely a new kind called 'Squiggly Spaghetti' she has recently bought. When he has eaten it, Mrs. Twit joyfully reveals the truth, to Mr. Twit's horror and disgust.

The Shrinks
In revenge for the Wormy Spaghetti, Mr. Twit glues pieces of wood no thicker than a penny onto Mrs. Twit's cane each night, as well as onto the legs of her chair, making Mrs. Twit believe that she is slowly shrinking.

Mr. Twit then frightens her by claiming that she has contracted an illness called the 'shrinks', by which she will be caused to disappear. Mr. Twit then claims that to cure the shrinks, Mrs. Twit will have to be 'stretched'. Mr. Twit then ties Mrs. Twit up in the garden to 60 gas balloons intending to leave her there for a while to teach her a lesson.

However, once Mrs. Twit makes the mistake of saying that if the strings break, it's goodbye for her, Mr. Twit pretends to tie some more strings to her ankles, before cutting through the strings and sending her skywards. Mrs. Twit eventually returns by biting through several of the balloon strings so she sinks slowly down, eventually collapsing on Mr. Twit in the garden and beating him senseless with her long walking stick immediately afterwards.

The Sticky Tree
There is a 'Big Dead Tree' in the Twits' garden, which Mr. Twit uses to trap birds by spreading HUGTIGHT Sticky Glue on the branches. Captive birds are then made into a pie by Mrs. Twit. During the story four schoolboys are caught instead of birds, but escape by unfastening their trousers and falling to the ground outside the Twits' garden after Mr. Twit said that he will make boy pie instead of bird pie. It is this use of glue that gives the captive monkey Muggle-Wump and his family the idea of using it against the Twits.

Rescuing the Animals
Using their friend the Roly-Poly Bird as an interpreter of languages, Muggle-Wump and his wife and children convey the warning that any bird landing on the Big Dead Tree will be cooked into Mrs. Twit's Bird Pie. When Mr. Twit, in retaliation, spreads glue on the monkeys' cage (which serves as a substitute perch), the monkeys alter the warning. The birds end up landing on the Twits' roof.

This enrages Mr. Twit, who doesn't want to keep waiting for his pie, so the Twits decide to go to the shop and buy a gun each. During their absence on this errand, Muggle-Wump plots a final trick: to turn the Twits' house upside down. With the help of the birds, Muggle-Wump removes the carpet from the floor, as well as all of the tables, chairs, and other objects in the house, and uses Mr. Twit's glue to stick the objects upside down to the ceiling, leaving the floor absolutely bare.

By doing this, the Twits will believe that they have been turned upside down, as they will be standing on what looks like the ceiling of their house and will stand on their heads to be the right way up. To keep their heads glued to the ground, two birds will put a small amount of glue on the Twits' heads right before they enter the house so that when they stand on their heads, they will be stuck.

Just as the preparations for this trick are finished, the Twits return home. Everything goes as planned, the Twits believed they've been turned upside down and so stand on their heads to counter it, only to be stuck to the bare floor. However, heads are not made to be stood upon. With so much weight on it from above, the Twits literally get 'the shrinks', as was mentioned earlier in the book. However, this time it's not a trick; it's the real thing. After a week or so, the Twits disappear, and everyone who knew of them shouts 'hooray!'. Meanwhile, The Muggle-Wumps and the Roly-Poly bird escape to their native African land.

Proposed film adaptation
Since February 2003, a feature film adaptation of the book has been in development by Vanguard Animation and its founder John H. Williams. As part of a multi-picture deal with Walt Disney Pictures, Vanguard was set to produce a CG animated/live-action film, with John Cleese and Kirk DeMicco writing the screenplay.

In November 2004, it was reported that Mark Mylod signed up to direct the feature, and that Cleese may star in the film. In October 2006, after the executive/regime changes at Disney, the project moved to Working Title and Universal. By January 2012, the official site of Vanguard Animation stated that Conrad Vernon, the director of Shrek 2 and Monsters vs. Aliens, would direct the film.

In April 2022, it was reported an animated television series for Netflix was now turned into a feature film with Spirit Untamed co-director Ennio Torresan Jr. set to replace Vernon as director.

Scrapped television series
An animated series based on The Twits, part of an "animated series event" based on Dahl's novels, was being developed by Netflix. On April 20, 2022, it was reported that the series was now being turned into an animated film.

Relations to other Roald Dahl books
 A monkey named Muggle-Wump also appears in The Enormous Crocodile. A monkey bearing resemblance to Quentin Blake's illustration of the same character also appears in The Giraffe and the Pelly and Me.
 A Roly-Poly Bird likewise makes an appearance in The Enormous Crocodile and is also to be found in Dirty Beasts.
 Certain things within the book, such as Mr. Twit's beard, 'Wormy Spaghetti' and bird pie, appear within Roald Dahl's Revolting Recipes.
 An extremely strong glue is also mentioned in Matilda.

References

Editions
 (audio CD read by Simon Callow, 2004)
 (hardcover, 2003)
 (paperback, 2002)
 (hardcover, 2002)
 (paperback, 2001)
 (paperback, 1991)
 (paperback, 1982)
 (hardcover, 1980)

External links
The Twits information and games

Children's books by Roald Dahl
Children's books adapted into films
British children's novels
Novels by Roald Dahl
Jonathan Cape books
Fictional rivalries
Fictional tricksters
Literary duos
1980 British novels
Fiction about size change
1980 children's books
Comedy literature characters